The 2017 Trofeo Faip–Perrel was the twelfth edition of a professional tennis tournament played on hard courts. It was part of the 2017 ATP Challenger Tour, and took place in Bergamo, Italy between 20 and 26 February 2016.

Singles main-draw entrants

Seeds

 1 Rankings were as of February 13, 2017.

Other entrants
The following players received wildcards into the singles main draw:
  Andrea Arnaboldi
  Matteo Berrettini
  Jerzy Janowicz
  Andreas Seppi

The following players received entry from the qualifying draw:
  Matthias Bachinger
  Rémi Boutillier
  Egor Gerasimov
  Yannick Hanfmann

The following players received entry as lucky losers:
  Alessandro Bega
  Nils Langer

Champions

Singles

 Jerzy Janowicz def.  Quentin Halys 6–4, 6–4.

Doubles

 Julian Knowle /  Adil Shamasdin def.  Dino Marcan /  Tristan-Samuel Weissborn 6–3, 6–3.

External links
Official Website

Trofeo Faip-Perrel
Trofeo Faip–Perrel